KNWN may refer to:

 KNWN (AM), a radio station (1000 AM) licensed to Seattle, Washington, United States
 KNWN-FM, a radio station (97.7 FM) licensed to Oakville, Washington